{{DISPLAYTITLE:Ƙ}}

Ƙ (minuscule: ƙ) is a letter of the Latin alphabet, used in Hausa to represent an ejective .

It was formerly used in the International Phonetic Alphabet to represent a voiceless velar implosive (currently ). It was withdrawn in 1993.

See also

Alphabets with this letter
African reference alphabet
Pan-Nigerian alphabet
Alphabets for the following specific languages
Hausa

External links
"Latin Extended B: Range 0180-024F" (Unicode code chart), specifically U+0198 and U+0199.

Phonetic transcription symbols
Latin letters with diacritics